The Magic Bullet is a compact blender sold by Homeland Housewares, a division of the American company Alchemy Worldwide, and sold in over 50 countries. It is widely marketed through television advertisements and infomercials and sold in retail stores under the "As seen on TV" banner. A feature-limited retail version not under this banner called the "Magic Bullet Single Shot+" is also available.

Since the introduction of the Magic Bullet, other incarnations include the Magic Bullet To Go, the Magic Bullet Mini, the Bullet Express, the Baby Bullet, the NutriBullet, the Party Bullet and the Dessert Bullet.

Product 
The Magic Bullet is a personal blender that is designed to be used as a space saving replacement for other appliances such as a blender, food processor, and electric juicer. The name is derived from the ogive-shaped curve of the blending cups.  The entire Magic Bullet system consists of an electric blender base with a number of attachments. Attachments included with the product include:
one of two available screw-on blade attachments; the "cross blade" (used for chopping foods and crushing ice),
two mixing cups, one short and one tall,
two handled cups, called by the manufacturer "Party Mugs", which can be used to blend individual drinks (also with colored "Comfort Rings" that screw over the threads),
lids for the cups, intended for storing foods, and
an instruction manual which also contains a recipe book (Magic Bullet 10 Second Recipes and Owner Manual), featuring recipes prepared in the infomercial and others.

Other add-ons can be purchased separately:
perforated lids for the cups that are used to ventilate items cooked in the cup when using a microwave oven, and to dispense hard foods that have been ground using the appliance,
the other of two available screw-on blade attachments: a "flat blade" (used for chopping harder foods, as well as for whipping),
other attachments include a full size blender pitcher and a manual juice extractor attachment.

Lawsuit and explosion allegations 
In May 2018, Fox affiliate KTTV in Los Angeles obtained test videos from NutriBullet which appeared to show the machine exploding in different situations, and some consumers told FOX11 they were injured by using the blender. Fourteen people have sued the company saying they were cut or burned when their NutriBullet exploded. The company has denied responsibility for the consumers’ injuries.

Usage 
The appliance is used by attaching a blade attachment to the desired cup and fitting the assembly upside down on top of the base. The base contains the motor that turns the blade, which is inside the cup. When one applies pressure to the top of the unit, the blade spins. If one turns the cup to lock into the base, it will continue to spin until it is disengaged.

Infomercial 
The Magic Bullet is known for its 30-minute infomercial, broadcast mostly in the early hours of the morning.

History 
The design for the Magic Bullet and its attachments is registered with the United States Patent and Trademark Office to Lenny Sands, CEO and founding partner of Alchemy Worldwide. 

Homeland Housewares has introduced add-ons and different versions of the Magic Bullet including the Bullet2Go (with various accessories), the Bullet Express, and a Fat Burning Boost supplement to be used in conjunction with the Magic Bullet. In 2015, Magic Bullet introduced an app that offers breakfast, lunch and dinner recipes to Magic Bullet users.

In October 2017, the Bluetooth-enabled NutriBullet Balance was released. The blender works with a companion app which allows users to track calories from ingredients processed using the machine.

Copyright infringement 
The Magic Bullet has been replicated and imitated on more than one occasion. Homeland Housewares, LLC, is a member of eBay’s Verified Rights Owner (VeRO) program and has created a Consumer Counterfeit Watch web page in order to help educate consumers regarding these issues.

References

External links
Magic Bullet, nutribullet.com

Kitchenware brands
Food preparation appliances
Bartending equipment
Infomercials